Shanghai Affairs is a 1998 Hong Kong martial arts film directed by and starring Donnie Yen.

Plot
Tong Shan (Donnie Yen) is a doctor who returns from Britain to Shanghai after graduating from medical school. Tong opens a clinic in a poor village in Shanghai to help sick people who cannot afford medical care. However, the Axe Gang, led by Yue Lo-chat, arrives and plans to tear apart the village and build a casino there. Tong and his assistant, Bond (Ruco Chan), protect the village and drive the gang away, angering Yue. One day, Tong meets Yue's younger sister, Yue Siu-sin (Athena Chu), who is mute due to an illness. Tong cures Siu-sin and their relationship grows closer, which angers Yue Siu-sin even more since he is against western medicine. Later, some kids are kidnapped and found dead without internal organs. Tong investigates and discovers that his mentor, Lui Mung, and Yue are the masterminds behind this. Lui and Yue frames Tong and Yue starts a persecution on Tong.

Cast
Donnie Yen as Tong Shan, the main protagonist, a charitable doctor who studied in Great Britain and returned to Shanghai to cure poor people.
Athena Chu as Yue Siu-sin, Yue Lo-chat's younger sister, a young girl who is mute due to an illness. She is later cured by Tong Shan and becomes his love interest.
Yu Rongguang as Yue Lo-chat, the main antagonist, the leader of the Axe Gang
Cheung Hung as Yip Ling, Yue Siu-sin's friend
Ruco Chan as Bond Lau, Tong Shan's assistant
Yan Yee-shek as Lung, Yue Lo-chat's henchmen who mistakenly killed Siu-sin during his mission to kill Tong Shan.
Sing Cheung-ban
Man Cho-han
Lam Yiu-san
Lee Qui
Lam Man-ying

External links
{} Shanghai Affairs at HKMDB.com
Shanghai Affairs at Hong Kong Cinemagic

Shanghai Affairs film review at LoveHKFilm.com

1998 films
1998 action films
1998 martial arts films
Hong Kong action films
Hong Kong martial arts films
Kung fu films
1990s Cantonese-language films
Films set in Shanghai
1990s Hong Kong films